Hormovë is a community in the Gjirokastër County, southern Albania. At the 2015 local government reform it became part of the municipality Tepelenë.

History
Hormovë was one of the Albanian Christian villages in the possession of the House of Moutzohoussates, the ancestral house of Ali Pasha. It was the largest and militarily strongest village of the region of Rrëzë (Riza).

During his stay in Hormovë, the Serbian monk Dositej Obradović estimated its size at around 700 houses, all built in stone. The group of 20 locals who greeted him on arrival offered to house him at the Saint Nicholas Monastery, which they claimed could house ten monks, but it was empty because they, as Albanians, do not like to be monks.

In 1784, Hormovë was attacked and destroyed by Ali Pasha as their loyalty to him had been uncertain after having abused his mother. Ali also roasted alive the village's leader, Çavuş Prift

In 1798, Sheh Mehmet Cama from Golem built a Halveti tekke in the village.

In 1821, when the Greek War of Independence broke up, a number of locals formed armed groups and supported the Independence struggle in Peloponnese and Central Greece, under leaders such as Diamantes and Kostas Chormovas (later known as Lagoumitzis).

In 1914, 217 Albanian men and boys from Hormovë were massacred on order of Athens by Greek rebels, north of the village of Kodër; inside the premises of the monastery of St. Mary. A lapidary in the village commemorates this massacre.
 
During World War II, the advancing Greek forces managed to enter the village after the Italian retreat, in December 11, 1940.

Notable people
Konstantinos Lagoumitzis (1781–1827), fighter of the Greek War of Independence.

Footnotes

References

Populated places in Tepelenë
Villages in Gjirokastër County